Boatswain's Mate John Breen (1827 to December 13, 1875) was an Irish soldier who fought in the American Civil War. Breen received the United States' highest award for bravery during combat, the Medal of Honor, for his action at Petersburg, Virginia on 3 October 1862. He was honored with the award on 3 April 1863.

Biography
Breen was born in 1827 in Ireland to William and Margaret Breen. He moved to New York and first enlisted into the United States Navy in 1852 under the name Charles Mercer. He was discharged after three years but later reenlisted under his correct name at the outbreak of the Civil War in 1861. During this service he was assigned to various vessels including the U.S.S. Brandywine, the U.S.S. Seymour and the U.S.S. Commodore Perry. It was aboard the USS Commodore that Breen earned the Medal of Honor for his action on 3 October 1862 in successfully repelling Confederate ground troops positioned at the Blackwater River.

Following the war, Breen and his wife, Ellen Grant, relocated to Milwaukee where he continued a career as a sailor. He died on 13 December 1875 of acute pneumonia and his remains are interred at the Calvary Cemetery and Mausoleum in Milwaukee.

Medal of Honor citation

See also

List of American Civil War Medal of Honor recipients: A–F

References

1827 births
1875 deaths
Date of birth unknown
Irish-born Medal of Honor recipients
Military personnel from Milwaukee
People of New York (state) in the American Civil War
Union Army officers
United States Army Medal of Honor recipients
American Civil War recipients of the Medal of Honor
Irish emigrants to the United States (before 1923)